Joy is a collaborative album by Californian musicians Ty Segall and Tim Presley (playing under the name White Fence). It was released in July 2018 under Drag City Records.

Accolades

Track listing

Charts

References

2018 albums
Ty Segall albums
Tim Presley albums
Drag City (record label) albums